P39 is a regional road (P-Highway) in Lviv and Ternopil Oblast, Ukraine. It runs northwest-southeast and connects Brody with Ternopil.

As of autumn 2014, the condition of the Lviv Oblast section of P39 is unsatisfactory.

See also

 Roads in Ukraine

References

Roads in Lviv Oblast
Roads in Ternopil Oblast